Stafford Springs is a census-designated place located in Stafford, Connecticut. The population was 4,988 at the 2010 Census. The village was a borough until November 1991, when it was disincorporated.

Located near the source of the Willimantic River,  the mill industry grew in the town due to its location and became the largest industry in the area. The village has the Holt Memorial Fountain and the former railroad station.

In the 18th century, the spring at Stafford Springs was famous for its reputed ability to cure "the gout, sterility, pulmonary, hysterics, etc." In 1771, John Adams, then a young lawyer, visited Stafford Springs for several days after suffering from overwork and anxiety.

Stafford Springs was once the headquarters of Station C of the Connecticut State Police, and subsequently was the site of the Troop C Barracks.

Currently Route 32, Route 190, Route 19, and Route 140 pass through or originate in the village.

Geography 
According to the United States Census Bureau, the CDP has a total area of 6.41 mi2 (16.6 km2).  6.37 mi2 (16.5 km2) of it is land and 0.036 mi2 (0.093 km2) of it (0.56%) is water.

References

External links 
 Town of Stafford
 MapQuest Directions

Census-designated places in Connecticut
Census-designated places in Tolland County, Connecticut
Stafford, Connecticut
Former municipalities in Connecticut
Populated places disestablished in 1991